Henry Lawson Drive is an  urban two-lane road located in Sydney, New South Wales, Australia. The road is named in honour of Henry Lawson (1867-1922), one of Australia's foremost poets.

It is designated as Main Road 508 for administrative purposes. In 1964, on its completion, it was signposted as part of ring road 5, replaced by state route 55 in 1974. The maximum elevation of the road is  AMSL and at its lowest point it is  AMSL. Other than at its eastern end from Alfords Point Road to Forest Road it is constructed as a single two-lane carriageway.

History

Henry Lawson Drive was conceived of as a scenic drive to follow the north bank of the Georges River. In its planning stages it was known as George's River feeder road. It was named Henry Lawson Drive in 1949. Most of the route (from Hume Hwy to The River Road) was built in the period 1946-1955, with some sections in Georges Hall, Milperra, East Hills, Picnic Point and Peakhurst  utilising pre-existing but unsealed roads. In 1963, following the closure of the Morgans Creek landfill waste disposal site at the southern end of The River Road, Henry Lawson Drive was extended to Padstow Heights with the completion of the  bridge over Little Salt Pan Creek. In September 1964 the final section was completed with the opening of the  bridge over Salt Pan Creek, connecting the road via what had formerly been Hymen Street to Forest Road in Peakhurst. In 1975 the T-intersection with Forest Road at the eastern terminus was reconfigured so that the route from Henry Lawson Drive to Forest Road northbound became the through route. Widening of the section from Alfords Point Road to Forest Road occurred incrementally, initially by reconfiguring pavement markings and construction of a westbound overtaking lane. It was later widened to four lanes in places and then six lanes. This work was completed in conjunction with the duplication of the Salt Pan Creek Bridge.

Future Route Development
, the road had high congestion levels and the City of Canterbury-Bankstown has been trying to overcome this.

In 2020 funding was allocated for the first of three stages of upgrading, from Auld Ave to Tower Road at Milperra (ie increasing the capacity of its junction with Milperra and Newbridge Roads). Subsequent stages are intended to see duplication to dual two-lane carriageways from the Hume Highway to the M5 tollway.

See also

References

Streets in Sydney